This is a list of Japanese prefectures by GDP.

Methodology 
Calculating GDP of Japanese prefectures is based on Japanese yen (JP¥), for easy comparison, all the GDP figures are converted into United States dollar (US$) or Renminbi (CN¥) according to current annual average exchange rates.

Note that due to heavy changes in yen/yuan/dollar rates, nominal GDP may not reflect relative economic strength in foreign currency terms, meaning that comparisons between years and prefectures are most meaningful in the native currency, the yen.

In 2011, the yen/dollar rate is 79.8 (average), valuing Japan's nominal 2011 GDP figure of 468.1 trillion yen, at US $5.87 trillion or 37.9 trillion yuan (at 6.4588/dollar).  That is less than the revised 2011 figure for China of 47.16 trillion yuan.
Using May 2013 exchange rates, the yen/dollar rate is 100, valuing Japan's 2011 nominal GDP at US $4.68 trillion or 28.688 trillion yuan (at 6.13/dollar).

2017 list

2014 list

2007 list

2005 list

See also 
List of Japanese prefectures by GDP per capita
List of Japanese prefectures by area
 List of Japanese prefectures by population

Sources
 GDP(JPY) is according to Japan statistical Yearbook 2011
 Annual average exchange rates: GDP (USD), accorfding to UN Countries GDP list, US$ 1 is equal to JP¥ 107.7655 in 2000,   JP¥ 110.2182 in 2005 and JP¥ 117.7535 in 2007. GDP (CNY), accorfding to China Statistical Yearbook, JP¥ 1 is equal to CN¥ 0.076864 in 2000, CN¥ 0.074484 in 2005 and CN¥ 0.064632 in 2007, see also List of Renminbi exchange rates.

References

GDP
 GDP
 GDP
Gross state product
Prefectures by GDP
Japan, GDP